The 1919 All-Ireland Senior Football Championship Final was the 32nd All-Ireland Final and the deciding match of the 1919 All-Ireland Senior Football Championship, an inter-county Gaelic football tournament for the top teams in Ireland. 

Wexford were the reigning champions, having completed a first senior four-in-a-row in 1918. However, Wexford did not qualify for the 1919 final as they were knocked out in the semi-final of that year's Leinster Senior Football Championship.

Kildare won an extremely one-sided final, with goals from Frank "Joyce" Conlan and Jim O'Connor.

This was Galway's first appearance in an All-Ireland football final. They would not win the All-Ireland football title until 1925, having also been beaten in the final of 1922.

References

Gaelic football
All-Ireland Senior Football Championship Finals
Galway county football team matches
Kildare county football team matches